Ricardo Alaníz Posada (born 20 March 1937) is a Mexican businessman and politician affiliated with the National Action Party. As of 2014 he served as Senator of the LVIII Legislature of the Mexican Congress representing Guanajuato and as Municipal President of León, Guanajuato between 2003 and 2006.

See also
 List of mayors of León, Mexico

References

1937 births
Living people
Businesspeople from Mexico City
Politicians from Mexico City
Members of the Senate of the Republic (Mexico)
National Action Party (Mexico) politicians
21st-century Mexican politicians
Municipal presidents in Guanajuato